Vincent Caldwell Taylor (born September 11, 1960) is a retired American professional basketball player who competed in the National Basketball Association (NBA) for one season and is the former assistant coach at Texas Tech University. He played college basketball at Duke, and in the NBA played for the New York Knicks.  Taylor also played briefly in the Continental Basketball Association for the Wisconsin Flyers. Taylor had a successful basketball career in Europe, playing a total 13 seasons on European teams in Italy (1984–86), France (1986–92), and Belgium (1992–97).

References

External links
Texas Tech bio
University of Minnesota bio
NBA bio
Louisville bio
LNB (France) stats

1960 births
Living people
American expatriate basketball people in Belgium
American expatriate basketball people in France
American expatriate basketball people in Italy
American men's basketball players
Basketball players from Lexington, Kentucky
Duke Blue Devils men's basketball players
ES Avignon Basket players
Gent Hawks players
Louisville Cardinals men's basketball coaches
Minnesota Golden Gophers men's basketball coaches
Minnesota Timberwolves assistant coaches
New York Knicks draft picks
New York Knicks players
Parade High School All-Americans (boys' basketball)
Pittsburgh Panthers men's basketball coaches
Shooting guards
SLUC Nancy Basket players
Sportspeople from Lexington, Kentucky
Texas Tech Red Raiders basketball coaches
UCF Knights men's basketball coaches
Wisconsin Flyers players
Wyoming Cowboys basketball coaches